Coretta Renay Brown (born October 21, 1980) is a former professional basketball player.

College
Brown played for University of North Carolina at Chapel Hill, where she was team captain in  her junior and senior seasons. She retired as the school's all-time leader in three-pointers made. She earned a Bachelor of Arts Degree in African American Studies and a minor in English.

North Carolina statistics
Source

Coaching career
Tennessee Technological University (assistant coach for three seasons)
Thomas University (head coach)
University of West Alabama (assistant coach)
Georgia Southern University (assistant coach)

Honors and awards

As a player
First-team all-ACC (2002-2003) 
Second-team all-conference (2001)

Personal life
Brown has three older sisters.

References

External links
Coretta Brown WNBA Stats | Basketball-Reference.com
Player Bio: Coretta Brown - University of North Carolina Tar Heels Official Athletic Site - University of North Carolina Tar Heels Official Athletic Site

1980 births
Living people
African-American basketball players
American women's basketball coaches
Chicago Sky players
Georgia Tech Yellow Jackets women's basketball coaches
Guards (basketball)
Indiana Fever players
North Carolina Tar Heels women's basketball players
People from Statesboro, Georgia
San Antonio Silver Stars draft picks
Tennessee Tech Golden Eagles women's basketball coaches
Thomas University faculty
American women academics
21st-century African-American sportspeople
21st-century African-American women
20th-century African-American people
20th-century African-American women